Paraguayan nationality law is based on the principle of Jus soli. The nationality law is based on the Chapter 3 of the Paraguayan Constitution of 1992. The legal means to acquire nationality, formal membership in a nation, differ from the relationship of rights and obligations between a national and the nation, known as citizenship.

Birth in Paraguay
Any person born in Paraguay acquires Paraguayan nationality at birth. The only exception applies to children of persons in the service of a foreign government (like foreign diplomats).

Naturalisation 
Foreigners may apply for Paraguayan nationality if they meet the following criteria: 
being older than 18 years old.
permanent resident in Paraguay for at least 3 years.
having a good behavior following the law.

Dual Nationality 
Dual nationality is permitted under the constitution of Paraguay on a reciprocity basis, meaning that unless Paraguay has a bilateral agreement with another nation, that other nationality is not permitted. As of 2022, the only countries that have a reciprocity agreement in regards to dual nationality with Paraguay are Spain and Italy.

Loss of nationality
In Paraguay, there is a distinction for loss of nationality between nationals born in Paraguay and those who have been naturalised. In the latter category, naturalising in another country or being expatriated from the country for more than three years without permission, results in loss of nationality, as provided in Article 150 of the National Constitution of Paraguay, and proceedings thereunder must be instituted by an individual or an agency, for instance, the Migration department. Paraguay does not accept dual nationality of naturalised persons.

References

Citations

Bibliography

External links
 Direccion General de Migraciones
 Paraguayan Constitution (in Spanish)

Nationality law
Law of Paraguay
Immigration to Paraguay